Gor or Gormati is a community presently spread across India, Pakistan, Afghanistan and worldwide. They belong to Indo-Aryan group said to be the originator of mankind.

References

Indo-Aryan peoples
Social groups of Afghanistan
Social groups of India
Social groups of Pakistan